Kurt Jensen (born 1950) is a Danish computer science professor at Aarhus University has been writing peer-reviewed papers since 1976, and by 2014 had an h-index of 32. He is best known for his research into coloured Petri nets.

References

Living people
1950 births
Academic staff of Aarhus University
Danish computer scientists